Fflach is a Welsh record label and recording studio.  It was founded in 1980 in Cardigan, Ceredigion, Wales by brothers Richard and Wyn Jones,Gareth Lewis and Robin Davies, members of Welsh new wave music group Ail Symudiad. Their first release was in early 1981, with their single/EP, Twristiad yn y Dre. The label gave an opportunity to record more new wave music in Wales for bands such as Y Ficar, Eryr Wen, Malcolm Neon, Angylion Stanley, Y Diawled, Rocyn and Maffia Mr. Huws.
 
Fflach has two subsidiary labels: Rasp, formed in 2000, which records and releases music by new rock and pop bands; and fflach:tradd, formed in 1997, which records and releases traditional music, specialising in indigenous musical instruments such as triple harp, crwth, pibgorn and Welsh bagpipes, thus gaining the label an internationally respected reputation.

Subsidiary labels
Fflach – Main label
Rasp – Rock and pop label
fflach:tradd – Traditional Welsh music, world music and jazz

Selected artists
On Fflach
 Ail Symudiad
 Dom
 Malcolm Neon

On Rasp
 Mattoidz
 Lowri Evans
 Garej Dolwen
 Y Ffug
 Bromas
 Castro

On fflach:tradd
 Llio Rhydderch
 Julie Murphy and Dylan Fowler
 Ceri Rhys Matthews
 Cass Meurig
 Sild
 Gwilym Bowen Rhys
 DnA (Delyth and Angharad Jenkins)

See also
 List of record labels

References

External links
 Fflach official website 

Welsh record labels